John Brain (9 February 1905 – 21 June 1961) was an Australian cricketer. He played two first-class matches for Tasmania between 1930 and 1931.

See also
 List of Tasmanian representative cricketers

References

External links
 

1905 births
1961 deaths
Australian cricketers
Tasmania cricketers
Cricketers from Hobart